Jan Christiaan Uiterwijk (May 16, 1915 - August 29, 2005) was a Dutch entrepreneur.

Jan Uiterwijk was born in Groningen to Daniel Uiterwijk and Dina Cornelia Verhagen. As a young man he and his brother were well known soccer players.  At the end of World War II he moved to America with his wife Maria and three boys (Robert, Jan D., and Hendrik).  In America he worked in international trade ultimately becoming an owner operator of several shipping lines, most notably Uiterwyk Corp located in Tampa, Florida.

1915 births
2005 deaths
20th-century Dutch businesspeople
Dutch emigrants to the United States
People from Groningen (city)
20th-century American businesspeople